Anjalikastra is a celestial weapon in Hindu mythology. Anjalikastra was a personal astra (celestial weapon) of the king of the devas, Indra. According to Hindu literature, using this weapon on an opponent decapitates them. In some stories, it is also said that Lakshmana - the brother of Rama - used same Anjalikastra to kill Indrajita. This astra is mentioned when Mahabharata's Arjuna used it to kill Karna.

Ramayana 
In some versions of Ramayana, it is said that Meghanada (Indrajita) was killed by the usage of Anjalikastra. Meghanada was granted a boon from Brahma that after the completion of the Yagna (fire-worship) of his native goddess Prathyangira -"Nikumbhila yagna", he will get a celestial chariot, mounting on which, he will win over any enemy in war and become invulnerable. But Brahma also cautioned him that whosoever would destroy this yagna would also kill him. Indrajita through severe penance convinced Brahma to give him a boon in which it was promised to him that Indrajita would only be killed by such a man who hadn't had sleep for Fourteen years continuously. Thus Lakshmana was only the person at that time whose life satisfied those conditions and thus he was the only person eligible to kill Indrajita. Knowing this Vibhishana requested Lakshmana to destroy Indrajit's yagna. Lakshmana was very successful in spoiling Indrajit's Nikumbhila Yagna and finally killed Meghanada using Anjalikastra.

Mahabharata 

On the 17th day of the Kurukshetra war, Karna and Arjuna faced each other and started fighting. As the battle intensified, Karna had an arrow on his neck by Arjuna by the Anjalikastra.

References

Weapons in Hindu mythology